UFC Fight Night: Volkan vs. Smith (also known as UFC Fight Night 138) was a mixed martial arts event produced by the Ultimate Fighting Championship that was held on October 27, 2018 at Avenir Centre in Moncton, New Brunswick, Canada.

Background 
While the UFC has hosted many events across Canada, the event marked the promotion's first visit to New Brunswick.

A light heavyweight bout between former UFC Light Heavyweight Championship challenger Volkan Oezdemir and Anthony Smith served as the event headliner.

Zubaira Tukhugov was scheduled to face Artem Lobov at the event. However, it was reported that Tukhugov was removed from the fight due his role in the UFC 229 post-fight melee. He was replaced by Michael Johnson.

Gavin Tucker was scheduled to face Andre Soukhamthath at the event. However, Tucker pulled out of the fight in early October citing an undisclosed injury and was replaced by promotional newcomer Jonathan Martinez.

At the weigh-ins, Johnson weighed in at 147 lb, 1 pound over the featherweight limit of 146 lb. He was fined 20% of his fight purse and his bout against Lobov proceeded at catchweight.

Results

Bonus awards
The following fighters received $50,000 bonuses:
Fight of the Night: Nasrat Haqparast vs. Thibault Gouti
Performance of the Night: Anthony Smith and Don Madge

See also 
 List of UFC events
 2018 in UFC
 List of current UFC fighters

References 

UFC Fight Night
2018 in mixed martial arts
2018 in Canadian sports
Mixed martial arts in Canada
Sport in Moncton
Sports competitions in Canada
Sports competitions in New Brunswick